Qutalmish ibn Arslan (alternative spellings: Qutalmis, Kutalmish) was a Turkic prince who was a member of Seljukid house in the 11th century. His son Kutalmışoğlu Suleiman, founded the Sultanate of Rum in what is now Turkey.

Sultanate of Rûm
Kutalmish was the son of Arslan Yabgu and a cousin of Tughril and played a vital role in the conquests of the Seljuq Turks. In 1046, he was sent with an army by Tughril to force back the Byzantine army at Ganja and was victorious.

He supported a rebellion against Tughril and contested the succession to the throne with Alp Arslan. (see Battle of Damghan (1063)) According to the historian Ali ibn al-Athir, Kutalmish knew the sciences of the stars. He has five sons, among them Mansur and Suleiman, who was recognized as Sultan of Rûm by Malik Shah I in 1084.

Name
"Qut almish" means "he that has received fortune (majesty)".

References

Sources

People from the Sultanate of Rum
11th-century Turkic people